Howard Turbyfill (March 25, 1913 - August 3, 1984) was an American weightlifter who competed in the 1932 Summer Olympics. In 1932 he finished sixth in the heavyweight class.

References

1913 births
1984 deaths
People from Palestine, Texas
People from Bakersville, North Carolina
American male weightlifters
Olympic weightlifters of the United States
Weightlifters at the 1932 Summer Olympics
20th-century American people